The Parish of Drumholm (sometimes spelled Drumhome or referred to as Ballintra) is a parish in the Roman Catholic Diocese of Raphoe. It is also a civil parish, with the variant spelling of Drumhome, in the barony of Tirhugh, County Donegal in Ireland. The parish contains all the land between the large towns of Ballyshannon and Donegal Town, including the small villages of Laghey, Ballintra and Rossnowlagh and the hamlet of Bridgetown. The parish has two Catholic primary schools: St Ernan's National School in Ballintra and St Eunan's National School in Laghey. The current parish priest is Fr Seamus Dagens, who succeeded  Fr Daniel McBrearty in 2007. Drumholm is also a parish for the Church of Ireland and a civil parish.

Churches 
Until recently there were three churches in the parish: St Bridget's Church, Ballintra; The Chapel of Ease, Laghey and the Immaculate Heart of Mary Church, Rossnowlagh. The main church is St Bridget's on the outskirts of Ballintra; it along with St Ernan's NS, the new and old parochial houses and St Bridget's Community Centre, all lie in the same area. The main graveyard is also located adjacent to the front of the Church. St Bridget's was built in 1845 and was most recently restored at the turn of the century.

The Chapel of Ease, located about eight kilometres east of Laghey, in the townland of Laghey Barr, is no longer used for regular services. The last mass was held on 8 June 2003, after which the then parish priest, Fr Daniel McBrearty, ended weekly Mass to the outrage of local residents. The Chapel opened in 1941 after the closure of the school which had previously been housed in the building; however, Mass had been said in its vicinity for centuries previously. Although Mass is no longer said, regular prayer meetings are held and the rosary is recited on Sundays.

The final and newest church is the Immaculate Heart of Mary in Rossnowlagh, opened in 1952. The new friary marked the return of the Franciscan Order to Donegal for the first time since the Four Masters and the dedication of the Church in June 1952 was attended by the then Taoiseach, Éamon de Valera and President Sean T. O'Ceallaigh. It is part of the Franciscan Friary in the village. The friary has a visitors' centre and the Donegal Historical Society Museum which houses a small collection including stone age flints and old Irish musical instruments, as well as decorative gardens that incorporate the Stations of the Cross. Prior to the closing of the Chapel in Laghey, the local priest and the friary used to take turns saying mass in Laghey and Ballintra, swapping on a weekly basis. However, due to dwindling numbers at the friary, friars rarely say mass in the remaining church in Ballintra.

Other information
The patron saint of the parish is St Ernan who is believed to have been born in the parish and to have established a monastery there. It is this saint who has given his name to St Ernan's NS, Ballintra and to the small island in Donegal Bay. He is also honoured in St Bridget's Church, Ballintra with a window above one of the two minor doors at the front of the building.

According to the parish website, there are 1,160 Catholics living in the parish, unfortunately there is no year or source given for these figures.

The main graveyard in Ballintra has been used since 1820 and the parish has several sets of records, including baptismal records from 1866, confirmation records from 1920, marriage records from 1866 and a death register from 1968.

There is no secondary school in the parish—children from the north of the parish (mainly from Laghey NS) go to the Abbey Vocational School in Donegal Town, while those from the south of the parish (mainly from Ballintra NS) go to Coláiste Cholmcille in Ballyshannon.

Parish bodies
Several groups organise on a parish basis including:
 St Bridget's GAA club
 The Laghey/Ballintra Youth Project
 Foróige (Teenage youth club)
 Laghey/Ballintra Swimming Club
 St Vincent de Paul

References

External links
 Drumholm Parish Homepage
 Raphoe Diocese Homepage

Roman Catholic Diocese of Raphoe
Civil parishes of County Donegal